The 1904 New Mexico A&M Aggies football team was an American football team that represented New Mexico College of Agriculture and Mechanical Arts (now known as New Mexico State University) during the 1904 college football season.  In their fifth year under head coach John O. Miller, the Aggies compiled a 1–2–1 record and outscored opponents by a total of 42 to 33. The team played its home games on College Field, later renamed Miller Field in honor of coach Miller.

Schedule

References

New Mexico AandM
New Mexico State Aggies football seasons
College football undefeated seasons
New Mexico AandM Aggies football